Time Frames is a 2021 album by Michael Waldrop, his third release with Origin Records. The recording is a crossover from classical to new music, jazz, minimalism and world music. The album was chosen for the 2021 AllMusic Guide Top 50 List of Classical Recordings.

Background

With two successful large ensemble, jazz recordings completed with Origin Records (Time Within Itself and Origin Suite), Michael Waldrop contracted with the label for the 3rd release.  The primary aim of the album was to focus of Waldrop's prowess as a classic mallet virtuoso.  Several of Waldrop's musical compositions made up the core of the album repertoire and several new works were commissioned for the project. Funding for Time Frames was provided by a University of Eastern Washington Faculty Research and Creative Work Fund (FRCW) grant (third FRCW grant Waldrop received).  Completed primary during the COVID-19 pandemic, remote recording was done in Los Angeles, Indianapolis and Memphis TN. Time Frames was chosen for the 2021 AllMusic Guide Top 50 List for Classical Recordings.

"Time Frames" features the marimba, its origins as an African percussion instrument and also includes jazz improvisation as a key element in the musical works/recording. Along with Waldrop, other established musicians are included on the release such as Gordon Stout, Brad Dutz, Jose Rossy and Marko Djordjevic. Jack Cooper's Three Mediterranean Views was specifically written for the Origin Records release.  Music on the recording covers a wide cross section of influences from jazz, classical, minimalism, popular music and numerous other genres.

Reception
Time Frames garnered numerous favorable reviews to include AllMusic, All About Jazz and the Percussive Arts Society.

"Although there are some passages where (two) drummers are playing in unison, the fusion of improvised and precomposed music is seamless. Time Frames reveals an unseen facet of Waldrop's musical individuality."
R.J. Lambert, All Music Guide

"Easy to appreciate, hard to categorize and impossible to ignore, Time Frames is a testament to one exceptional percussionist's determination, skill and creative vision."
 Dan Bilawsky, All About Jazz

Track listing
 Fractals 2:24
 Dem Dakar (Parables) 6:11
 Three Mediterranean Views: León de Palamidi 3:08
 Three Mediterranean Views: Notte a Venezia 3:16
 Three Mediterranean Views: Château d'If 3:24
 Almost Beyond 5:24
 Delineations 5:29
 Katrina's Path: Brazil 2:28
 Katrina's Path: Cuba 1:35
 Katrina's Path: New Orleans 2:59
 Hollow 7:00
 Sixth Chakra 3:50
 Incoming 9:34
 Tortoise Efficiency 4:19
 Continuity 3:01

Music composed by Michael Waldrop except:
(3-5) Jack Cooper
(6) Nathan Daughtrey
(11) Jonathan Middleton
(13) Gordon Stout
(14) Brad Dutz

Personnel 
Michael Waldrop - marimba (1,2,3,5,6,11,14) vibraphone (4), drum set (8-10,12,13) keyboard sequencing (1,2,7,12,15)
Jose Rossy - Djembe, Djun Djuns, Shekere and miscellaneous percussion (1,2,7,12,15)
Brad Dutz - bongos, congas, doumbek, riq, percussion (1,3-5,14)
Steve Snyder - piano (3-5)
Alex Pershounin - acoustic bass (3,5)
Sam Shoup - acoustic bass (4)
Ivana Cojbasic - acoustic piano (6)
Marko Djordjevic - drum set (10)
Gordon Stout - marimba (13)

Production
John Bishop - Executive producer, cover photo, design and layout
Michael Waldrop, Tim Reppert - producers
Tim Reppert - mixing, Boston, MA
Scott Kinsey - mastering, Los Angeles, CA
Jordan Lewis - Waldrop photos 
Phillip Mawarire - Zimbabwean Shona sculpture ("The Drummer") 
Percussion - Recorded by Jimi Tunnell, Buffalo Sound, Denton, TX; Nov, 2020
(3-6) Marimba / Piano / Vibes - Recorded by SaCha MÜller, Dead Aunt Thelma's Studio, Portland, OR Dec, 2020
(3-5) Percussion - Recorded by Brad Dutz, Los Angeles, CA / Piano - Recorded by Alan Johnson, Static Shack, Indianapolis, IN
Bass - Recorded by Travis Huisman, Catamount Recording. Cedar Falls, IA; Nov, 2020
(4) Bass - Recorded by Matt Tutor, Bloodworth Studio, Memphis, TN
(8-10) Recorded by Steve Gamberoni, SFCC, Spokane, WA; Jan, 2019
(11) Recorded by Shawn Trail, EWU Recital Hall, Cheney, WA; June 2020
(13) Recorded by Tim Reppert, REP Studio, Ithaca, NY; Dec, 2005
(14) Recorded by Wayne Peet, KillZone Studio, Los Angeles, CA; August 2010

Charts

Release history

See also

Michael Waldrop
Origin Records
Gordon Stout
Jack Cooper

References

External links

2021 albums
Albums by American artists